Northland Conservation Park is a group of protected areas in the Northland Region of New Zealand's North Island.

The park includes Waipoua Forest and a number of other sites managed by the New Zealand Department of Conservation, including Warawara, Herekino, Maungataniwha, Raetea, Omahuta, Waima, Mataraua, Puketi, Waikino, Russell, Hukerenui, Kaiikanui, Kaihu, Houto, Pukenui and Tangihua Forests.

Maungataniwha Forest and Raetea Forest are open for hunting.

History

The Waipoua Forest Sanctuary was formally established in 1953 following a long public campaign.

The Northland Conservation Park was established in 1984, and came under the management of the Department of Conservation when it was established in 1987.

Since 1988, the Department has been investigating the establishment of a national park based around Waipoua Forest. Since 2008, the Department has been consulting with Te Roroa on establishing a national park within its tribal area.

References

Protected areas of the Northland Region
Far North District
Whangarei District
Kaipara District
1984 establishments in New Zealand
Protected areas established in 1984